Bulmershe Court was a campus of the University of Reading, situated in what is now the Reading suburb of Woodley, in the English county of Berkshire.

Historically, Bulmershe Court has been the name of a manor and of two quite distinct country houses, one of which still stands but is now known as Bulmershe Manor.
The site first opened for teaching in 1964 as Bulmershe College. That merged with the University of Reading in 1989 to create the Bulmershe Court campus. It closed in 2012 and all its activities have moved to either the London Road Campus or Whiteknights Park.

On 23 December 2013, CALA Homes acquired the site for a residential development of 290 dwellings. On 25 December 2013 Bulmershe Court hall of residence was burnt down.

Campus

Academic profile
Bulmershe College became the Bulmershe Court Campus of the University of Reading in 1989, housing its Faculty of Education (later Institute of Education) and Community Studies (later School of Health and Social Care). It continued to  offer courses in education, community studies, social work, and film, theatre and television studies until 2011/12.

Buildings
Original buildings were retained and updated, including a £1 million refurbishment of the existing Bob Kayley Studio building (named after the first Head of Film and Drama at Bulmershe College) into a fully fitted 90 seater theatre also open to the public.

The former Bridges Hall space was converted into a lecture theatre, and several new student halls of residence were built on the site as part of Bulmershe Hall.

The campus was made up of many different buildings, some of those being accommodation retained from the original Bulmershe College – including Mitford, Penn, Winchcombe and Blagrave – and some newly built on merger with the University, including Hollins and Huntley. One of the original halls continued to bear the name Blagrave in testament to the long history of buildings on the site.

The refurbished Bob Kayley Studio (referred to above) saw its last performance in December 2010. Courses in Film and Drama Studies were being moved to the main Whiteknights campus and to a new purpose built home – the Minghella Building – named after the late film director Anthony Minghella, who was made an Honorary Professor of the University in 2006 before his death.

Closure
Financial pressures faced by the University of Reading after the Global Financial Crisis of 2007–8, and the usual university re-organisations, meant that from 2010 there had been uncertainty about the fate of accommodation and teaching on the campus. With the end of teaching and most accommodation in 2011 the University set about redeveloping the site for housing and an old peoples' care home. The Library was moved to Whiteknights.

Social work programmes ended in September 2011. Courses were transferred to the University of West London (formerly Thames Valley University), who operate them from a Reading site in Crescent Road (previously the home of the Reading College of Technology).

All activity on the Bulmershe Campus ended in 2012 apart from use of the playing fields. Institute of Education courses were relocated to completely refurbished University buildings based at London Road campus in 2012. By 2013, all education activity has ceased and some buildings yet to be demolished were offered for temporary commercial rental.

Re-development
The re-development of the grounds had to take into account of the listed nature of the old Bulmershe Court manor building.

University plans changed again and on 23 December 2013, CALA Homes acquired the site for a residential development of 290 dwellings.. The newer halls will be converted to residential flats. Much of the rest will be demolished. On 25 December 2013 Bulmershe Court hall of residence burnt down and later demolished.
As of October 2017, the site is still being developed.

References
David Nash Ford (2004). Royal Berkshire History – Old Bulmershe Court. Retrieved 31 July 2005.
David Nash Ford (2004). Royal Berkshire History – Woodley Lodge. Retrieved 31 July 2005. It is made up of many different halls, including Mitford, Penn, Hollins, Huntley, Winchcombe and Blagrave.

External links
Former Bulmershe Court page from the University website
CALA Homes Bulmershe Campus

Grade II* listed buildings in Reading
Country houses in Berkshire
University of Reading
University and college campuses in the United Kingdom
History of Reading, Berkshire
Borough of Wokingham
British country houses destroyed in the 20th century
1964 establishments in England
2013 disestablishments in England